Richens Lacy (or Lacey) Wootton (1816 - 1893), often referred to as "Uncle Dick" Wootton, was an American frontiersman born in Virginia, but lived most of his life in Colorado.

In his early life Wootton was a mountain man and trapper, then a hunter at Bent's Fort.  In 1866, he hired a tribe of Utes under Chief Conniache to build a toll road through Raton Pass.  He later sold the road to the Atchison, Topeka and Santa Fe Railroad and the railroad named one of their locomotives after him.

He appears as a character in Flashman and the Redskins when Flashman employs him as a guide.  Flashman and his caravan are forced to abandon him when he catches cholera.

He is referenced in Michener's "Centennial ".

References

 online biography of Wootton

1816 births
1893 deaths
American pioneers